Eric Zachhuber (born 27 September 1993) is an Austrian footballer who plays for SK St. Magdalena.

Honours 
Altach
Runner-up
 Austrian Football First League (2): 2011–12, 2012–13

External links 
 

1993 births
Living people
Austrian footballers
FC Juniors OÖ players
SC Rheindorf Altach players
SC Austria Lustenau players
SK Austria Klagenfurt players
Association football midfielders
SV Wallern players